The R-3 motorway (Autopista Radial R-3) is a Spanish motorway connecting Madrid (M-30), Arganda del Rey (A-3) and Tarancón (A-3).

References

Autopistas and autovías in Spain